Vonones was the name of three kings of the ancient Middle East:
Vonones of Sakastan, ruled c. 75–57 BC
Vonones I, ruled c. AD 8–12
Vonones II, ruled c. AD 51

It is also used in zoology:
Vonones (harvestman), a genus of harvestmen in the family Cosmetidae